Kirby Hill is the name of several places in North Yorkshire, England:

 Kirby Hill, Harrogate
 Kirby Hill, Richmondshire